Yellow, red and orange goods are a three-part classification for consumer goods which is based on consumer buying habits, the durability of the goods, and the ways that the goods are sold. The classifications are for yellow goods, red goods, and orange goods, with orange goods being goods that have a mix of yellow and red characteristics. The classification of goods into yellow, red, and orange categories is roughly equivalent to the categories of shopping goods, convenience goods, and specialty goods.

Yellow goods
Yellow goods (also called "shopping goods" or "white goods") are durable consumer items such as large household appliances that have a long period of useful life, and which are replaced rarely. While yellow goods are sold in low volumes, they have high profit margins. Yellow goods have a higher unit value than convenience goods and people buy them less often; as such consumers spend more time comparison shopping for yellow goods than for red goods. As well, there is a much greater role for personal selling (from salespeople) for yellow goods than for red goods, and there is more selective distribution of yellow goods. Yellow goods often need to be adjusted or customized by the store before they are delivered to the customer. 

The consumer goods term "yellow goods" is different from the construction and agricultural industry term of the same name, which refers to bulldozers, tractors, and similar equipment.

Red goods
Red goods (also called "convenience goods") such as food are consumed completely when the consumer uses them; as a result, they are replaced frequently and sold in high volumes. Red goods have low profit margins. Red goods need heavy advertising and competitive pricing, along with a well-developed selling organization to manage the widespread and numerous points of sale. As red goods are widely available through a wide distribution network, consumers do not have to spend much time searching for them.

Orange goods
Orange goods (also called "specialty goods") are moderately durable goods that wear out with regular use and have to be replaced, such as clothing. Orange goods are unique, so consumers need to make more effort to acquire these items; as such exclusive distributor arrangements and franchises are often used to sell them.

References

Goods (economics)